Bozhil Lozanov (born 16 August 1934) is a Bulgarian boxer. He competed in the men's heavyweight event at the 1956 Summer Olympics.

References

1934 births
Living people
Bulgarian male boxers
Olympic boxers of Bulgaria
Boxers at the 1956 Summer Olympics
Place of birth missing (living people)
Heavyweight boxers
20th-century Bulgarian people